Apradhi Kaun? is a 1957 Indian Hindi-language mystery thriller film directed by Asit Sen and produced by Bimal Roy. The film stars Abhi Bhattacharya, Mala Sinha and Gajanan Jagirdar. It is based on the Bengali novel Kaalo Chhaya by Premendra Mitra.

Plot 

After Shrinath, a wealthy heir is murdered, the people of his household are suspected. Rajesh Nath, the private investigator handling the case, later falls in love with one of them.

Cast 
Abhi Bhattacharya as Rajesh Nath
Mala Sinha as Shobha
Gajanan Jagirdar as Shrinath and Dinanath
Kammo as Champa
Paul Mahendra as Inspector Varma
Tarun Bose
Lillian- Lillian Ezra (listed as Lillian)

Soundtrack 
All songs were composed by Salil Chowdhury, with lyrics written by Majrooh Sultanpuri.

References

External links 
 

1950s Hindi-language films
1950s mystery thriller films
Films based on Indian novels
Films based on mystery novels
Films based on thriller novels
Films scored by Salil Chowdhury
Indian mystery thriller films